Edward Cruz may refer to:

 Ted Cruz (born 1970), United States Senator from Texas, 2016 Presidential candidate
 Edward Acevedo Cruz (born 1985), Dominican footballer